Aetomylaeus bovinus, also known as the bull ray, duckbill ray, or duckbill eagle ray, is a species of large stingray of the family Myliobatidae found around the coasts of Europe and Africa.

Biology and ecology
The species is ovoviviparous and reach sexual maturity at 4 to 6 years old. With a low fecundity of three to four pups per litter and a long gestation of 6 to 12 months (depending on the geographical zone), this species have a very sensitive life history. Very little is known concerning the ecology and behavior of A. bovinus, however it is part of the coastal marine megafauna, with a maximum length of 222 cm (87.4 in) and 116 kg (225.7 lbs), bull rays can be considered as giants of the shallow waters. Their maximum length and very narrow depth range of 0 to 30 m exposes them to various threats. Indeed, large-body, shallow-water species are at greatest risk of threats. Bull ray appears to be extremely rare throughout the Mediterranean region and its current population trend is highly suspected to be decreasing.

This fish is named the bull ray because of the shape of its head and it is sometimes called the duckbill ray in South Africa for its long, flat, round snout. Females are larger and heavier than males.

Bull rays are "bentho-pelagic" feeders, which means that they feed on the sea floor and the water column. They feed on various invertebrates including crabs, hermit crabs, squids, prawns, gastropod molluscs and bivalve molluscs. They often cause damage to clam and oyster farms.

Threats
Aetomylaeus bovinus is facing various and numerous threats, from fisheries to habitat degradation. As it is a benthic and semi-pelagic feeder, it is by-catch by a large game of industrial or artisanal fishing gear, especially pelagic trawling, bottom trawling, trammel nets, gill nets and spearfishing. Little information is available concerning this species in Africa, however old literature refers to a discard of 900 tones per year of bull rays by-caught by shrimp trawlers on the West African coast in 1988 during their late juvenile and sub/adult phase.

Conservation and status
On a global scale, Aetomylaeus bovinus is classified as Critically Endangered. The bull ray is now part of the 53% of elasmobranchs native to the Mediterranean Sea that are at risk of extinction and require urgent action to conserve their population and habitats. Bull rays appear to be extremely rare throughout the Mediterranean region and their current population trend is highly suspected to be decreasing (by 80% during the last 45 years according to IUCN). There are currently no species-specific measures in place. Much research is required on the bull ray's population, size, trend, habitat, ecology, and threats. In order to protect the bull ray, its habitat needs to be protected, its harvest monitored and managed, and implementation of education and awareness programs could be beneficial.

Distribution and habitat
The full distribution of the bull ray is uncertain but it is known to be found in the Mediterranean Sea, the Black Sea, the eastern Atlantic Ocean between Portugal and Guinea, the Atlantic from north of Saldanha Bay in western South Africa and round the rest of the South African coast into the Indian Ocean up to Maputo Bay in southern Mozambique, also Zanzibar and Kenya.

It frequents both the bottom and the surface and sometimes leaps from the water.

The population size, trend, habitat, ecology and dynamic of the species remain unknown, however, like many members of the family Myliobatidae, Aetomylaeus bovinus is a potential migratory species.

References

Aetomylaeus
Fish described in 1817